Tsankov is a Bulgarian masculine surname, its feminine counterpart is Tsankova. It may refer to

Aleksandar Tsankov (1879–1959), Bulgarian politician
Antonio Tsankov (born 1990), Bulgarian football player
Asen Tsankov (1912–1994), Bulgarian tennis player and alpine skier
Bobi Tsankov (1979-2019), Bulgarian journalist, crime writer and radio personality
Dragan Tsankov (1828–1911), Bulgarian politician
Ivan Tsankov  (born 1984), Bulgarian football player
Petko Tsankov (born 1995), Bulgarian football player
Tsanko Tsankov (born 1979), Bulgarian volleyball player
Tsvetomir Tsankov (born 1984), Bulgarian football goalkeeper

Bulgarian-language surnames